Mandingo is an American theatrical play written by Jack Kirkland and based on the 1957 novel of the same name by Kyle Onstott. The cast of the Broadway production included Dennis Hopper, Brooke Hayward, Franchot Tone, Rockne Tarkington, and Georgia Burke. The story was made into a film by Paramount Pictures in 1975, directed by Richard Fleischer.

Synopsis
An African slave is trained to fight other slaves on an antebellum Southern plantation.

References

External links

Plays about slavery
1961 plays
Plays based on novels
Broadway plays
Plays about race and ethnicity
American plays adapted into films
Plays set in the United States